La Jarne is a commune in the Charente-Maritime department in southwestern France. It is 7 km southeast of the city of La Rochelle.

Population

See also
Communes of the Charente-Maritime department

References

External links

 La Jarne on the Quid site

Communes of Charente-Maritime
Charente-Maritime communes articles needing translation from French Wikipedia